Sarcophrynium is a genus of plant in family Marantaceae indigenous to tropical Africa. It was described as a genus in 1902.

 Species

 Sarcophrynium bisubulatum (K.Schum.) K.Schum. in H.G.A.Engler (ed.) - Zaïre
 Sarcophrynium brachystachyum (Benth.) K.Schum. in H.G.A.Engler (ed.) - C + W Africa
 Sarcophrynium congolense Loes. in G.W.J.Mildbraed (ed.) - Zaïre
 Sarcophrynium prionogonium (K.Schum.) K.Schum. in H.G.A.Engler (ed.) - C + W Africa
 Sarcophrynium schweinfurthianum (Kuntze) Milne-Redh. - C + E Africa
 Sarcophrynium villosum (Benth.) K.Schum. in H.G.A.Engler (ed.) - Gabon

References

 
Zingiberales genera
Flora of Africa
Taxonomy articles created by Polbot